Publia Fulvia Plautilla (c. 185/around 188/189 – 211) was the wife of the Roman emperor Caracalla, her paternal second cousin. After her father was condemned for treason, she was exiled and eventually killed, possibly on Caracalla's orders.

Birth and family
Plautilla was born and raised in Rome. She belonged to the gens Fulvia of ancient Rome. The Fulvius family was of plebeian origin, came from Tusculum, Italy and had been active in politics since the Roman Republic. Her mother was named Hortensia; her father was Gaius Fulvius Plautianus, the Commander of the Praetorian Guard, consul, paternal first cousin and close ally to Roman Emperor Lucius Septimius Severus (the father of Caracalla). She also had a brother, Gaius Fulvius Plautius Hortensianus.

Severus and Plautianus arranged for Plautilla and Caracalla to be married in a lavish ceremony in April 202. The forced marriage proved to be very unhappy; Caracalla despised her. According to Cassius Dio, Plautilla had a profligate character.

According to numismatic evidence, Plautilla and Caracalla had a daughter, whose name is unknown, in 204. In the same year, her father-in-law ordered the erection of the Arch of Septimius Severus, honoring him and his family, including his wife, Empress Julia Domna, Caracalla, Plautilla and her brother-in-law Publius Septimius Geta.

Exile
On January 22, 205 Gaius Fulvius Plautianus was executed for treachery and his family properties were confiscated. Plautilla and her brother were exiled by Caracalla to Sicily and then to Lipari. They were treated very harshly and were eventually strangled, possibly on Caracalla's orders after the death of Septimius Severus on February 4, 211.

Contemporary depictions

Coins bearing her image that have survived are mainly from the reign of her father-in-law. They are inscribed Plautilla Augusta or Plautillae Augustae.

A marble bust of Fulvia Plautilla is in the Louvre.

The Solinjanka or Salonitanka, meaning "woman from the city of Solin (ancient Salona)", one of the most important Roman portraits found in Croatia, is believed to depict Plautilla at a young age.
 Originally found in Salona, it is now kept in the Archaeological museum in Zagreb.

Severan dynasty family tree

References

External links

 http://www.treasurerealm.com/coinpapers/romanemperors/plautilla.html
 https://web.archive.org/web/20070928092559/http://vessels-of-time.com/women_of_rome.htm
 http://www.roman-emperors.org/caracala.htm#Note_pfp
 https://web.archive.org/web/20070907023111/http://www.forumancientcoins.com/historia/coins/r4/r1461.htm
 http://penelope.uchicago.edu/Thayer/E/Gazetteer/Places/Europe/Italy/Lazio/Roma/Rome/_Texts/PLATOP*/Arcus_Argentariorum.html
 http://www.trajancoins.com/plautilla.htm
 
  Marble portrait of Plautilla kept in Archaeological museum in Zagreb. 

180s births
211 deaths
Year of birth uncertain
Executed Roman empresses
People executed by the Roman Empire
Severan dynasty
Plautilla
2nd-century Roman women
3rd-century Roman empresses
People executed by strangulation
Augustae
Caracalla